The fylfot or fylfot cross and its mirror image, the gammadion are a type of swastika associated with medieval Anglo-Saxon culture. It is a cross with perpendicular extensions, usually at 90° or close angles, radiating in the same direction. However at least in modern heraldry texts, such as Friar and Woodcock & Robinson (see ) the fylfot differs somewhat from the archetypal form of the swastika: always upright and typically with truncated limbs, as shown in the figure at right.

Etymology
The most commonly cited etymology for this is that it comes from the notion common among 19th-century antiquarians, but based on only a single 1500 manuscript,  that it was used to fill empty space at the foot of stained-glass windows in medieval churches. This etymology is often cited in modern dictionaries (such as the Collins English Dictionary and Merriam-Webster Online).

History
The fylfot, together with its sister figures, the gammadion and the swastika, has been found in a great variety of contexts over the centuries. It has occurred in both secular and sacred contexts in the British Isles, elsewhere in Europe, in Asia Minor and in Africa.

While these two terms might be broadly interchangeable in some places, we can detect a certain degree of affinity between term and terrain. Thus we might associate the Gammadion more with Byzantium, Rome and Graeco-Roman culture on the one hand, and the Fylfot more with Celtic and Anglo-Saxon culture on the other. Although the gammadion is very similar to the fylfot in appearance, it is thought to have originated from the conjunction of four capital 'Gammas', the third letter of the Greek alphabet but that the similarity of the symbols is coincidental.

Both of these swastika-like crosses may have been indigenous to the British Isles before the Roman invasion. Certainly they were in evidence a thousand years earlier but these may have been largely imports. They were certainly substantially in evidence during the Romano-British period with widespread examples of the duplicated Greek fret motif appearing on mosaics. After the withdrawal of the Romans in the early 5th century there followed the Anglo-Saxon and Jutish migrations.
 
The fylfot is known to have been very popular amongst these incoming tribes from Northern Europe, as it is found on artefacts such as brooches, sword hilts and funerary urns. Although the findings at Sutton Hoo are most instructive about the style of lordly Anglo-Saxon burials, the Fylfot or Gammadion on the silver dish unearthed there clearly had an Eastern provenance.

The Fylfot was widely adopted in the early Christian centuries.  It is found extensively in the Roman catacombs. 
A most unusual example of its usage is to be found in the porch of the parish church of Great Canfield, Essex, England. As the parish guide rightly states, the Fylfot or Gammadion can be traced back to the Roman catacombs where it appears in both Christian and pagan contexts. More recently it has been found on grave-slabs in Scotland and Ireland. A particularly interesting example was found in Barhobble, Wigtownshire in Scotland.

Gospel books also contain examples of this form of the Christian cross. The most notable examples are probably the Book of Kells and the Lindisfarne Gospels.  Mention must also be made of an intriguing example of this decoration that occurs on the Ardagh Chalice.  

From the early 14th century on, the Fylfot was often used to adorn Eucharistic robes. During that period it appeared on the monumental brasses that preserved the memory of those priests thus attired. They are mostly to be found in East Anglia and the Home Counties.

Probably its most conspicuous usage has been its incorporation in stained glass windows notably in Cambridge and Edinburgh. In Cambridge it is found in the baptismal window of the Church of the Holy Sepulchre, together with other allied Christian symbols, originating in the 19th century. In Scotland, it is found in a window in the Scottish National War Memorial in Edinburgh.  The work was undertaken by Douglas Strachan and installed during the 1920s.  He was also responsible for a window in the chapel of Westminster College, Cambridge.  A similar usage is to be found in the Central Congregational Church in Providence, Rhode Island, USA. 
 
It was not a little surprising to find the Fylfot on church bells in England. They were adopted by the Heathcote family in Derbyshire as part of their iconographic tradition in the 16th and 17th centuries. This is probably an example where pagan and Christian influence both have a part to play as the Fylfot was amongst other things the symbol of Thor, the Norse god of thunder and its use on bells suggests it was linked to the dispelling of thunder in popular mythology.

In heraldry
 

In modern heraldry texts, the fylfot is typically shown with truncated limbs, rather like a cross potent that's had one arm of each T cut off. It's also known as a cross cramponned, ~nnée, or ~nny, as each arm resembles a crampon or angle-iron (compare ). Examples of fylfots in heraldry are extremely rare, and the charge is not mentioned in Oswald Barron's article on "Heraldry" in most 20th-century editions of Encyclopædia Britannica. Parker (1894) includes it in his A glossary of terms used in heraldry,  noting that only one instance occurs on coats of arms, that of Chamberlayne.

A 20th-century example (with four heraldic roses) can be seen in the Lotta Svärd emblem.

Modern use of the term

From its use in heraldryor from its use by antiquariesfylfot has become an established word for this symbol, in at least British English. 

However, it was only rarely used. Wilson, writing in 1896, says, "The use of Fylfot is confined to comparatively few persons in Great Britain and, possibly, Scandinavia. Outside of these countries it is scarcely known, used, or understood".

In more recent times, fylfot has gained greater currency within the areas of design history and collecting, where it is used to distinguish the swastika motif as used in designs and jewellery from that used in Nazi paraphernalia. Even though the swastika does not derive from Nazism, it has become associated with it, and fylfot functions as a more acceptable term for a "good" swastika. 

Hansard for 12 June 1996 reports a House of Commons discussion about the badge of No. 273 Fighter Squadron, Royal Air Force.  In this, fylfot is used to describe the ancient symbol, and swastika used as if it refers only to the symbol used by the Nazis.

Odinic Rite (OR), a neo-völkisch Germanic pagan organization, use both "swastika" and "fylfot" for what they claim as a "holy symbol of Odinism". The OR fylfot is depicted with curved outer limbs, more like a "sunwheel swastika" than a traditional (square) swastika or heraldic fylfot.

See also

 Buddhism
 Hinduism
 Jainism
 Boreyko coat of arms
 Triskelion
 Brigid's cross
 Ugunskrusts
 Western use of the Swastika in the early 20th century

References

Bibliography
 Stephen Friar (ed.), A New Dictionary of Heraldry (Alpha Books 1987 ); figure, p. 121
 Thomas Woodcock and John Martin Robinson, The Oxford Guide to Heraldry (Oxford 1990 ); figure, p. 200

External links

Crosses in heraldry
Cross symbols
Swastika
Visual motifs